Anna Hjälmkvist (born 25 March 1993) is a Swedish footballer who played for Växjö DFF.

External links 
 

1993 births
Living people
Swedish women's footballers
Östers IF players
Jitex BK players
Vittsjö GIK players
Damallsvenskan players
Women's association football midfielders
Växjö DFF players